Liberty Township is one of the thirteen townships of Henry County, Ohio, United States.

Population
As of the 2010 census the population was 2,581, of whom 1,317 lived in the unincorporated portion of the township.

Geography
Located in the northern part of the county, it borders the following townships:
York Township, Fulton County - north
Swan Creek Township, Fulton County - northeast corner
Washington Township - east
Damascus Township - southeast corner
Harrison Township - south
Napoleon Township - southwest corner
Freedom Township - west
Clinton Township, Fulton County - northwest corner

The village of Liberty Center is located in the eastern portion of the township, and a portion of the city of Napoleon, the Henry county seat, is in the southwest part of the township.

Name and history
It is one of twenty-five Liberty Townships statewide.

Government
The township is governed by a three-member board of trustees, who are elected in November of odd-numbered years to a four-year term beginning on the following January 1. Two are elected in the year after the presidential election and one is elected in the year before it. There is also an elected township fiscal officer, who serves a four-year term beginning on April 1 of the year after the election, which is held in November of the year before the presidential election. Vacancies in the fiscal officership or on the board of trustees are filled by the remaining trustees.

Public education for the township is administered by the Liberty Center Local School District.

References

External links
County website

Townships in Henry County, Ohio
Townships in Ohio
Populated places in Henry County, Ohio